The Jailhouse is a 2009 American psychological thriller film starring C. Thomas Howell, Lindsey McKeon, Rey Valentin and Darren Dalton. It was written and directed by Billy Lewis and produced by Brandon Luck and Heath Franklin. The film features a family moving into a house that used to be a jail when they discover it's haunted.  The Jailhouse premiered on May 1, 2009 at the Cape Fear Independent Film Festival, was released in 16 theaters in 10 states beginning May 4, 2010.  The Jailhouse made its world television premiere on the Chiller Network on February 4, 2011

Plot

Small town, the American dream. A blue-collar family living the idyllic rural lifestyle. Nothing is out of place except for the lack of white picket fences and the old jail that occupies the second floor of their century old home. Seth Delray (C. Thomas Howell) knew the possibilities before he moved his wife and two kids into the old jailhouse, but the Sheriff assured him that it would be an act of God to put that place back into service. Times are tight, and it was just too good of a deal to refuse. That is, until the county jail caught fire. The Sheriff hands were tied and he had to put the displaced inmates anywhere he could find iron bars with a locking door. The Delray's were his only option. For Seth the worst wasn't the locked up criminals above his living room, it was the mortal fear in his children's eyes, the piercing cold looks from his wife. The deep, dark creeping recognition that something had happened there, something terrible, something that would rip his soul with a hundred year old hands.

Cast
 C. Thomas Howell as Seth Delray
 Lindsey McKeon as Maddy
 Darren Dalton as Donnie
 Rey Valentin as Stark
 Siri Baruc as Grace
 David Schifter as Calvin Simpkins
 Madison Weidberg as Jillian
 Brandon Luck as Jim Kenton
 Phillip Troy Linger as Sheriff Hooper

References

External links

2009 films
2009 psychological thriller films
Films shot in North Carolina
2000s English-language films